Yibbi Jansen (born 18 November 1999) is a Dutch field hockey player. She began playing for HC Den Bosch and moved to Oranje-Rood in Eindhoven in 2016.

Jansen made her debut for the Netherlands national team on the 28th of January 2018, at the age of eighteen, in a friendly match against the United States.  She played her first international tournament at the last edition of the Champions Trophy in Changzhou, China. She is the daughter of former field hockey goalkeeper Ronald Jansen.

References

1999 births
Living people
Dutch female field hockey players
Female field hockey midfielders
HC Den Bosch players
HC Oranje-Rood players
SCHC players
21st-century Dutch women